In Christian tradition, the seven heavenly virtues combine the four cardinal virtues of prudence, justice, temperance, and fortitude with the three theological virtues of faith, hope, and charity.

The seven capital virtues, also known as contrary or remedial virtues, are those opposite the seven deadly sins. They are often enumerated as chastity, temperance, charity, diligence, patience, kindness, and humility.

Seven heavenly virtues

Cardinal virtues

The four cardinal virtues were first defined by 4th-century theologian Ambrose as "temperance, justice, prudence, and fortitude". These were also named as cardinal virtues by Augustine of Hippo, and were subsequently adopted by the Catholic Church. They are described as "human virtues" in the Catholic Catechism.

Prior to Ambrose, these four qualities were identified by the Greek philosopher Plato as the necessary character traits of a good man, and were discussed by other ancient authors such as Cicero. They can also be found in the Jewish Book of Wisdom, which states that wisdom "teaches moderation and prudence, righteousness and fortitude, and nothing in life is more useful than these."

Theological virtues

The theological virtues are those named by Paul the Apostle in 1 Corinthians 13: "So faith, hope, love remain, these three; but the greatest of these is love." The word "love" (agape in Greek) is translated in the King James Bible as "charity".

The traditional understanding of the difference between cardinal and theological virtues is that the latter are not fully accessible to humans in their natural state without assistance from God. Thomas Aquinas believed that while the cardinal virtues could be formed through habitual practice, the theological virtues could only be practised by divine grace.

Seven capital virtues
The seven capital virtues (also known as the contrary or remedial virtues) are those thought to stand in opposition to the seven capital vices (or deadly sins).

Prudentius, writing in the 5th century, was the first author to allegorically represent Christian morality as a struggle between seven sins and seven virtues. His poem Psychomachia depicts a battle between female personifications of virtues and vices, with each virtue confronting and defeating a particular vice. However, Prudentius did not base his allegory on the cardinal and theological virtues, nor did he use the traditional list of capital vices. The combatants in the Psychomachia are as follows:

The success of this work popularised the concept of capital virtues among medieval authors. In AD 590, the seven capital vices were revised by Pope Gregory I, which led to the creation of new lists of corresponding capital virtues. In modern times, the capital virtues are commonly identified as the following:

Although some medieval authors attempted to contrast the capital vices with the heavenly virtues, such efforts were rare. According to historian István P. Bejczy, "the capital vices are more often contrasted with the remedial or contrary virtues in medieval moral literature than with the principal virtues, while the principal virtues are frequently accompanied by a set of mirroring vices rather than by the seven deadly sins".

See also
 Holy obedience
 Aristotle's list of virtues

References

 
Asceticism
Catholic doctrines
Christian ethics
7 Seven virtues
Spirituality
Virtue
Christian terminology